The  is Japanese aerial lift line, operated by Tanigawadake Ropeway Company. The Tōbu Group company also operates another aerial lift line, Harunasan Ropeway.  Opened in 1960, the line climbs Mount Tanigawa Tenjindaira Ski Resort, Minakami, Gunma. The line is operated all seasons, transporting skiers, hikers, or tourists.

Basic data 

System:
Until August 2005: Gondola lift, 3 cables
From September 2005: Funitel
Elevation at top: 1319m
Distance: 
Vertical interval: 
Passenger capacity per a cabin: 22
Cabins: 14
Stations: 2
Time required for single ride: 10 minutes

See also 

 List of aerial lifts in Japan

External links 
  Tanigawadake Ropeway Company official website

Gondola lifts in Japan
1960 establishments in Japan